Jay Jay Okocha Stadium is a stadium in Ogwashi-Uku, Aniocha South, Nigeria named after former Super Eagles captain Jay-Jay Okocha. It is currently used mostly for football matches and the home stadium of Delta Force F.C. Renamed after Okocha in June 2008, the stadium has a capacity of 8,000 people and hosted matches for the 2008 WAFU U-20 Championship won by Ghana.

References

Football venues in Nigeria
Delta State